Johnston Peak is a sharp dark peak in Antarctica,  north of Mount Marr and  northwest of Douglas Peak. It was discovered in January 1930 by the British Australian New Zealand Antarctic Research Expedition under Mawson, who named it for Professor Thomas Harvey Johnston, the chief biologist to the expedition.

See also
McDonald Ridge, ice-covered ridge between Johnston Peak and Douglas Peak

References

External links

Mountains of Enderby Land